The following is a list of notable events and releases of the year 1879 in Norwegian music.

Events

Deaths

 December
 22 – Hanna Bergwitz-Goffeng, pianist and piano teacher (born 1821).

Births

 May
 27 – Per Reidarson, composer and music critic (died 1954).

 July
 31 – Cally Monrad, singer, actress and poet (died 1950).

 October
 5 – Halfdan Cleve, composer (died 1951).
 23 – Johan Austbø, teacher, dancer, poet, composer, singer, and proponent of Nynorsk (died 1945).

See also
 1879 in Norway
 Music of Norway

References

 
Norwegian music
Norwegian
Music
1870s in Norwegian music